William Bradford Reed (June 30, 1806 – February 18, 1876) was an American attorney, politician, diplomat, academic and journalist from Pennsylvania.  He served as a member of the Pennsylvania House of Representatives from 1834 to 1835.  He was elected Pennsylvania State Attorney General in 1838 and served as a member of the Pennsylvania State Senate for the 1st district in 1841.  He served as U.S. Minister to China in 1857.  His pro-confederacy views put him in conflict with other Pennsylvania politicians.  He was a published author of multiple books including the biographies of his grandfather, General Joseph Reed and grandmother Esther de Berdt.

Early life and education
Reed was born in Philadelphia, Pennsylvania to Joseph Reed and Maria Ellis Watmough.  He graduated from the University of Pennsylvania in 1825 he went to Mexico as a private secretary for Joel R. Poinsett and studied law.

His brother was educator Henry Hope Reed.

Career
Reed began his political career as an Anti-Mason but switched to the Whig Party.  He was elected to the Pennsylvania House of Representatives and served from 1834 to 1835.  He was elected Pennsylvania Attorney General in 1838.  He served as vice-president of the Law Academy of Philadelphia from 1840 to 1841.  He was elected as a member of the Pennsylvania State Senate for the 1st district in 1841.  He worked as a professor of American history at the University of Pennsylvania in 1850.

Between 1851 through 1856 Reed served as the District Attorney of Philadelphia. In 1856, he was elected to the American Philosophical Society.

Reed served as Minister to China from 1857 to 1858 In China, the U.S. had been neutral in the Second Opium War of 1856–58. Buchanan appointed Reed as Minister to China because Reed helped Buchanan win in 1856 by persuading old-line Whigs to support a Democrat. Reed's goal in China was to negotiate a new treaty that would win for the United States the privileges Britain and France had forced on China in the war. Reed did well.  The Treaty of Tientsin (1858) granted American diplomats the right to reside in Peking, reduced tariff levels for American goods, and guaranteed the free exercise of religion by foreigners in China. The treaty helped set the roots of what later became Washington's Open Door policy.

After his return to the U.S. in 1860 he was active in Democratic Party politics and in New York journalism.  For a time he was an American correspondent of The Times of London.  Reed published many controversial and historical pamphlets and contributed essays chiefly to the American Quarterly and the North American Review.  He wrote about his grandfather Joseph Reed in the book Life and Correspondence of Joseph Reed in 1847 and his grandmother Esther Reed in the book Life of Esther de Berdt in 1853.

He joined the Democratic party in 1856 and was ostracized due to his pro-confederacy views during the U.S. Civil War.

He was hired to defend Confederate president Jefferson Davis in court after the U.S. Civil War was over, however Davis never went to trial.

He is interred at the St. James the Less Episcopal Churchyard in Philadelphia, Pennsylvania.

References

|-

|-

 

History of the foreign relations of China
Lawyers from Philadelphia
University of Pennsylvania faculty
Pennsylvania Democrats
1806 births
1876 deaths
District Attorneys of Philadelphia
Pennsylvania Attorneys General
Pennsylvania Whigs
19th-century American diplomats
19th-century American journalists
American male journalists
19th-century male writers
19th-century American politicians
Ambassadors of the United States to China
Reed family (Pennsylvania and New Jersey)